Michael Cassidy, is a South African Christian leader, evangelist, writer and founder of Africa Enterprise, known for his initiatives at ecumenism, and reconciliation on personal, church and political levels.

Early life
He was born on 24 September 1936 in Johannesburg, South Africa, the son of Charles Stewart Cassidy and Mary Reading..  Michael Cassidy converted to Christianity in 1954 at the Harringay Arena in the United Kingdom during a Billy Graham crusade. Michael Cassidy cites Billy Graham as one of two dominant influences in his life.  The other influence in his life was John Stott who is noted as the leader of the worldwide evangelical movement.

Education
Cassidy went to school at Michaelhouse in Natal, he attended Cambridge University where he studied Modern and Medieval Languages and was a awarded a bachelor's degree and a Master of Arts degree in 1958. He attended Fuller Theological Seminary in 1963 completing a Bachelor of Divinity and the Azusa Pacific University in California in 1993.

Career
Cassidy founded and led African Enterprise in Pietermaritzburg, Kwazulu-Natal since 1961. Charles E. Fuller who was the founder of Fuller Theological Seminary helped Michael Cassidy get started on African Enterprise by identifying the first three Board Members for him (Bruce Bare, James Gorton and his secretary, Rose Baessler). He made his secretarial staff available to Michael plus a small loan of seed money and he provided five tickets for the first African Enterprise Team to travel to Pietermaritzburg, South Africa for the Pietermaritzburg Mission in 1961.

In 1992 Billy Graham asked Michael Cassidy to visit Nelson Mandela after Graham had received a letter from Mandela.  Cassidy presented Mandela with a signed copy of Billy Graham's book Peace with God.  At Nelson Mandela's request Michael Cassidy networked with other religious leaders to press for reconciliation before South Africa's election in 1994 and after.

In 1974 Michael Cassidy was part of the First International Congress on World Evangelization and was part of the initial planning meeting for the Congress.  He was instrumental in bringing the Conference to Cape Town, South Africa in 2010. In 2012 he was made the Honorary Chairman of the Lausanne Movement for World Evangelisation. He was also recognised as Fuller Theological Seminary's Distinguished Alumnus of 2012.

Honours
Member of Order of Simon of Cyrene

Works

References

External links
Michael Cassidy and Friends Foundation
Excerpts from The Church Jesus Prayed For: A personal journey into John 17 by Michael Cassidy
Sermons preached by Michael Cassidy at the Church of the Ascension in Hilton, KwaZulu-Natal

1936 births
Living people
South African Christian religious leaders
Alumni of Michaelhouse
People from Johannesburg
Alumni of the University of Cambridge